Trifurcula stoechadella is a moth of the family Nepticulidae. It is found in the western Mediterranean region, from France and the Iberian Peninsula to Corsica and Italy.

The larvae feed on Lavandula stoechas. They mine the leaves of their host plant. The mine consists of a fine, upper-surface corridor. The mine fully circles the leaf margin, then descends through the petiole and stem to the leaf below. This is repeated two more times. Only in the third and latest leaf, the mine has become full depth. Initially, the frass is deposited in an extremely narrow line that fills the entire gallery, later in a broad black central line that leaves a broad clear margin at either side.

External links
bladmineerders.nl
Fauna Europaea

Nepticulidae
Moths of Europe
Moths described in 1975